Brett Hampton (born 30 April 1991) is a New Zealand cricketer who plays for Northern Districts. He made his first-class debut on 23 October 2015 in the 2015–16 Plunket Shield. In June 2018, he was awarded a contract with Northern Districts for the 2018–19 season.

On 7 November 2018, in the fifth round fixture of the 2018–19 Ford Trophy between Northern Districts and Central Districts, he and Joe Carter set a new record in List A cricket for the most runs scored off one over, with 43. The over was bowled by Willem Ludick and included two no-balls, six sixes, a four and a single.

References

External links
 

1991 births
Living people
New Zealand cricketers
Canterbury cricketers
Northern Districts cricketers
Sportspeople from Tauranga